ISO/IEC 18014 Information technology — Security techniques — Time-stamping services is an international standard that specifies time-stamping techniques. It comprises four parts:
 Part 1: Framework
 Part 2: Mechanisms producing independent tokens
 Part 3: Mechanisms producing linked tokens
 Part 4: Traceability of time sources

Part 1: Framework 
In this first part of ISO/IEC 18014, several things are explained and developed:
 The identification of the objectives of a time authority.
 The description of a general model on which time stamping services are based.
 The definition of time stamping services.
 The definition of the basic protocols of time stamping.
 The specifications of the protocols between the involved entities.

Key words: audit, non-repudiation, security, time-stamp

Part 2: Mechanisms producing independent tokens
A time-stamping service provides evidence that a data item existed before a certain point in time. Time-stamp services produce time-stamp tokens, which are data structures containing a verifiable cryptographic binding between a data item's representation and a time-value. This part of ISO/IEC 18014 defines time-stamping mechanisms that produce independent tokens, which can be verified one by one.

Part 3: Mechanisms producing linked tokens 
This part of ISO/IEC 18014:
 Describes a general model for time-stamping services producing linked tokens.
 Describes the basic components used to construct a time-stamping service of this type.
 Defines the data structures used to interact with a time-stamping service of this type.
 Describes specific instances of such time-stamping services.

References 

Cryptography standards
18014